Lat Mahalleh (also Romanized as Lāt Maḩalleh) is a village in Siyarastaq Yeylaq Rural District, Rahimabad District, Rudsar County, Gilan Province, Iran. At the 2006 census, its population was 41, in 13 families.

References 

Populated places in Rudsar County